The Marvel Action Hour, later Marvel Action Universe, was a 1994–1996 syndicated television block from Genesis Entertainment featuring animated adaptions of Marvel Comics superheroes X-Men, Iron Man, Fantastic Four, Spider-Man, Incredible Hulk, Silver Surfer, Spider-Man Unlimted, Avengers United They Stand, and Biker Mice from Mars. It aired in syndication for two years before being cancelled.

Format
The first half of the hour was an episode of Iron Man; the second half, an episode of Fantastic Four. During the first season, Stan Lee introduced the episode.

Both the Fantastic Four and Iron Man were radically retooled for the second seasons, sporting new opening sequences, improved animation, and more mature writing, though the introductions by Stan Lee were shortened and now against a green screen displaying various production paintings from both shows.

In most markets, the second season was known as Marvel Action Universe, which was the name of a previous syndicated programming block in the late 1980s, with the addition of Biker Mice from Mars extending the block to 90 minutes. The structure was like this: there was a pre-opening overview of the each respective series, then the Marvel Action Universe opening, then the Stan Lee intro, then the episode prologue, then the regular show opening, and finally the episode.

UK modification
The show underwent a notable modification when broadcast on the BBC in the United Kingdom; because the BBC does not feature commercial breaks, the two shows that made up the Marvel Action Hour would actually only have totaled about forty minutes, and so episodes of the 1980s Incredible Hulk series were added between the two original shows to bring the whole bundle up to the promised hour in length. The Stan Lee segments were, however, dropped.  First series was broadcast from 20 April until 22 June 1996 with 3 further episodes in late August and early September.  The series was repeated in 1997 and 1998; however, the BBC did not screen Marvel Action Universe, due to the fact Channel 4 held the UK rights to Biker Mice from Mars.

Series overview programme
Iron Man and Fantastic Four (September 24, 1994 – February 24, 1996)
Biker Mice from Mars from the second season.

CBBC Animated Series overview programme
Incredible Hulk (September 18, 1982 – October 8, 1983) was added into the programme.

Stations
Generally, New World owned television stations broadcast The Marvel Action Hour along with generally Fox, The WB, UPN, or independent stations in markets where New World did not own a station.

See also
 Spider-Man (1994 TV series)
 The Incredible Hulk (1996 TV series)
 X-Men (TV series)

References

Television programming blocks in the United States